Needles is a city in San Bernardino County, California, in the Mojave Desert region of Southern California. Situated on the western banks of the Colorado River, Needles is located near the California border with Arizona and Nevada. The city is accessible via Interstate 40 and U.S. Route 95. The population was 4,959 at the 2020 census, up from 4,844 at the 2010 census.

History

Needles was founded in May 1883 during the construction of the Atchison, Topeka and Santa Fe Railway, which originally crossed the Colorado River at Eastbridge, Arizona three miles southeast of modern Needles. Needles was named after "The Needles", a group of pinnacles in the Mohave Mountains on the Arizona side of the river. The crossing was a poor site for a bridge, lacking firm banks and a solid bottom.

A bridge was actually built, but it was of poor quality. Not only was it a "flimsy looking structure", but it was an obstacle to navigation on the river. The flooding of the Colorado River destroyed the bridge three times – in 1884, 1886 and 1888. The railway built Red Rock Bridge, a high cantilever bridge, at a narrower point with solid rock footings ten miles downstream near today's Topock. The bridge was completed in May 1890, and the old bridge was dismantled.

At first simply a tent town for railroad construction crews, the railway would eventually build a hotel, car sheds, shops and a roundhouse. Within only a month, Needles would have a Chinese laundry, a newsstand, a restaurant, several general stores, and about nine or ten saloons. Needles quickly became the largest port on the river above Yuma, Arizona. The railway and the Fred Harvey Company built the elegant Neoclassical and Beaux-Arts style El Garces Hotel and Santa Fe Station in 1908, which was considered the "crown jewel" of the entire Fred Harvey chain. The landmark building is on the National Register of Historic Places and is being restored.

Needles was a major stop on the historic U.S. Route 66 highway from the 1920s through the 1960s. For migrants from the Midwest Dust Bowl in the 1930s, it was the first town that marked their arrival in California. The city is lined with motels and other shops from that era. The "Carty's Camp", which appears briefly in The Grapes of Wrath as the Joad family enters California from Arizona, is now a ghost tourist court, its remains located behind the 1940s-era 66 Motel.

In 1949, the United States Bureau of Reclamation began an extensive project to dredge a new channel for the Colorado River that would straighten out a river bend that was causing serious silt problems since the Hoover Dam was completed.

Needles is a tourism and recreation center. The city is the eastern gateway to the Mojave National Preserve, a scenic desert area.

Geography

Climate 

Needles, like Death Valley to the northwest, is known for extreme heat during the summer. The Needles weather station is frequently reported by the United States government's National Oceanic and Atmospheric Administration (NOAA) as the site of the highest daily temperature recorded in the U.S. during the desert summers. Needles occasionally sets national or world daily temperature records, along with other related records associated with extreme desert heat.

On August 13, 2012, Needles experienced a thunderstorm that deposited rain at a temperature of  starting at 3:56 pm, setting a new record for the hottest rain in world history. Since the humidity was only 11%, the rain evaporated so that "only a trace of precipitation was recorded in the rain gauge". Weather records researcher Maximiliano Herrera reported that this was the lowest humidity at which rain has occurred on Earth in recorded history.

Snowfall is very rare in Needles, with the only month recording measurable snowfall being January 1949, when  of snow fell, including  inches on January 12, 1949. The city is also known for moderate to locally severe thunderstorms during the monsoon season as well as humid conditions.

Needles is served by the National Weather Service's NOAA Weather Radio operating on 162.50 MHz from the Las Vegas National Weather Service.

Demographics

2000
As of the census of 2000, there were 4,830 people, 1,940 households, and 1,268 families residing in the city. The estimated population in July 2006: 5,330 (+10.4% change). The racial makeup of the city was 77.9% White, 1.6% African American, 7.0% Native American, 1.4% Asian, 0.1% Pacific Islander, 6.4% from other races, and 5.6% from two or more races. Hispanic or Latino of any race were 18.4% of the population.

There were 1,940 households, out of which 31.2% had children under the age of 18 living with them, 42.5% were married couples living together, 16.8% had a female householder with no husband present, and 34.6% were non-families. 29.0% of all households were made up of individuals, and 13.1% had someone living alone who was 65 years of age or older. The average household size was 2.5 and the average family size was 3.0.

In the city, the population was spread out, with 27.6% under the age of 18, 7.5% from 18 to 24, 23.6% from 25 to 44, 25.6% from 45 to 64, and 15.7% who were 65 years of age or older. The median age was 39 years. For every 100 females, there were 96.7 males. For every 100 females age 18 and over, there were 92.2 males.

The median income for a household in the city was $26,108, and the median income for a family was $33,264. Males had a median income of $39,688 versus $19,483 for females. The per capita income for the city was $15,156. About 21.2% of families and 26.1% of the population were below the poverty line, including 38.2% of those under age 18 and 11.3% of those age 65 or over.

Major employment in the city is supported by the BNSF Railway (formerly the Santa Fe Railroad). The depot has been a terminal (crew change point) for the railway since the late 19th century. The railroad company has been the city's main employment source for over a century.

The once smaller nearby communities of Bullhead City, Arizona, Lake Havasu City, Arizona, and Laughlin, Nevada have in recent years become larger communities than Needles.

2010

The 2010 United States Census reported that Needles had a population of 4,844. The racial makeup of Needles was 3,669 (75.7%) White (65.4% Non-Hispanic White), 95 (2.0%) African American, 399 (8.2%) Native American, 35 (0.7%) Asian, 9 (0.2%) Pacific Islander, 323 (6.7%) from other races, and 314 (6.5%) from two or more races. Hispanic or Latino of any race were 1,083 persons (22.4%).

The Census reported that 4,839 people (99.9% of the population) lived in households, 5 (0.1%) lived in non-institutionalized group quarters, and 0 (0%) were institutionalized.

There were 1,918 households, out of which 650 (33.9%) had children under the age of 18 living in them, 712 (37.1%) were opposite-sex married couples living together, 331 (17.3%) had a female householder with no husband present, 159 (8.3%) had a male householder with no wife present.  There were 186 (9.7%) unmarried opposite-sex partnerships, and 6 (0.3%) same-sex married couples or partnerships. 588 households (30.7%) were made up of individuals, and 238 (12.4%) had someone living alone who was 65 years of age or older. The average household size was 2.52. There were 1,202 families (62.7% of all households); the average family size was 3.12.

The population was spread out, with 1,283 people (26.5%) under the age of 18, 401 people (8.3%) aged 18 to 24, 1,038 people (21.4%) aged 25 to 44, 1,357 people (28.0%) aged 45 to 64, and 765 people (15.8%) who were 65 years of age or older. The median age was 39.3 years. For every 100 females, there were 101.6 males.  For every 100 females age 18 and over, there were 95.0 males.

The homeowner vacancy rate was 4.9%; the rental vacancy rate was 17.2%. 2,578 people (53.2% of the population) lived in owner-occupied housing units and 2,261 people (46.7%) lived in rental housing units.

According to the 2010 United States Census, Needles had a median household income of $29,613, with 28.8% of the population living below the poverty line.

Government

The City of Needles was incorporated on October 30, 1913.  It is a charter city, led by an elected mayor and a city council with six elected members.  Mayors serve two-year terms of office, and councilmembers serve four-year terms. The council designates a vice mayor from among its members. The city council also appoints a city manager who is responsible for the operation of city departments. As of January 2020, the current city manager is Rick Daniels.

State and federal representation

Proposals for secession
In 2008, claiming the county had been unwilling to help keep the city's troubled hospital open as a full-service medical facility, the city considered seceding from California and becoming part of neighboring Nevada, only a few miles away.  The options of attaching itself to the state of Arizona or even forming a new county were also considered. Proposals to change states would require approval from the United States Congress and both state legislatures.

Education
Needles' elementary schools and Needles High School are part of the Needles Unified School District. The school district is one of the largest in the United States in terms of area with almost  in its boundaries. The district runs from Amboy to Needles, and south to Parker Dam. It has 1,158 students enrolled. 

The local Needles schools include Katie Hohstadt Elementary School, formerly called 'D' Street School (new home of Needles Head Start, and no longer a regular public school),  Vista Colorado Elementary School (grades K–5),  Needles Middle School (grades 6–8), Needles High School (grades 9–12), and the Educational Training Center (grades 9–12). Needles High School, due to its distance from other California schools, is a member of the Nevada Interscholastic Activities Association, along with four other similarly placed California schools: Truckee, North Tahoe, South Tahoe, and Coleville.

Needles also has two private schools: the Needles Assembly of God Christian School and the Needles Seventh-day Adventist School.

Infrastructure

Transportation
Interstate 40, known locally as the Needles Freeway, is the major highway through Needles, connecting Barstow to the west and Arizona to the east. U.S. Route 95 also enters the city from the east on former Route 66 as a concurrency with the I-40 freeway, then splits with the Interstate west of the city, and heads north to Nevada. The Colorado River Bridge connects Needles directly with Mohave County, Arizona, and Arizona State Route 95.

Amtrak, the national passenger rail system, provides daily service to Needles station, operating its Southwest Chief between Chicago and Los Angeles. It arrives between midnight and 2 am.

Local transit service to the Needles area is provided by Needles Area Transit.

As of August 2, 2016, Victor Valley Transit Authority has service from Needles to Barstow and Victorville on Fridays. To Barstow and Victorville, the bus leaves at 6:15 and arrives at Victorville at 10:30 am. On the reverse trip, buses leave Victorville at 2:30 pm and arrives at Barstow at 7:15 pm.

Vegas Airporter provides service between Lake Havasu City, Needles, and Harry Reid International Airport in Las Vegas.

Public safety 
On July 1, 2016, San Bernardino County Fire Department annexed the City of Needles. Fire Station 32 provides fire protection to the City of Needles and houses two Type 1 Engine companies, one Type 7 Engine company, one Water Tender and one 28 foot fireboat. The station is staffed full-time with career firefighters.

Since December 1989 the City of Needles has been patrolled by the San Bernardino County Sheriff's Department under the command of Captain Ross Tarangle from the Needles Patrol Station.

Health
Colorado Medical Center was once a full service hospital but at present it's functioning as an urgent care.

Notable people
 Pat Morris, Mayor of San Bernardino, California.
 Max Rafferty, Needles Superintendent of Schools, 1955–1961, became California Superintendent of Public Instruction 1962–1970.
 Charles Schulz, cartoonist of Peanuts, lived in Needles 1928–30 and made it the residence of Snoopy's brother Spike.
 Bess Houdini, wife and stage assistant of famed escape artist Harry Houdini, died in Needles in 1943.
Yara tav, leader of the Mohave people (1861–1874), born close to the Needles rock formation before the establishment of the town.
Alice Notley, American poet, grew up in Needles.
Natalie Diaz American poet and winner of the 2021 Pulitzer Prize for Poetry.

In popular culture

Books
 In John Steinbeck's novel The Grapes of Wrath, the Joad family stops in Needles when they enter California on Route 66.
 Leslie Marmon Silko's novel Gardens in the Dunes is largely set in and around Needles in the late 19th century.

Print
 In the comic strip Peanuts Snoopy's brother Spike lived in the desert outside Needles. He frequently heads to Needles to partake of the town's nightlife, often running afoul of the local coyotes.

Recordings
 In 2004, John Lowery (John 5), former guitarist for Marilyn Manson, released his CD Vertigo, in which the first track is entitled "Needles CA".
 The town is mentioned in the lyrics of Hoyt Axton's "Never Been to Spain"; the song was a hit for Three Dog Night in 1972 and was also performed by Elvis:

Well I never been to England, but I kinda like the Beatles. Well, I headed for Las Vegas, only made it out to Needles. Can you feel it? Must be real. It feels so good!

 Izzy Stradlin's 1999 album Ride On includes a track entitled "Needles" about his love of visiting the town.
 In 2009 the song "Don't Look Down" by Barnaby Bright includes the following:

 We pulled into a truck stop Somewhere just outside of Needles, California, You asked me for ten bucks and I said "What about the last ten bucks I loaned you?"

Television
 In October 2006, two students and two teachers from Needles High School were invited to Washington, D.C. to meet with the Under Secretary of Defense, in which they spoke of the new program at Needles High School called MOCK National Security Workshop. The students were also interviewed for the nationwide, fifteen-minute television news show, Channel One News; the episode was aired on October 25.
 Needles was the main site of a 2009 UFO Hunters episode investigating a supposed UFO Crash.
 Needles High School was on a School Pride television episode on November 12, 2010.

Other connections
 In late 2000 to early 2001, skateboarder Tony Hawk donated $20,000 to the Needles Skate Park, which is still in use .  Hawk was present for the grand opening of the park in January 2004.
 Needles (and the surrounding area) was the scene for the hit 1988 post-apocalyptic computer RPG Wasteland.
 Murals were painted of U.S. 66, which passed through Needles on its way between Chicago and Los Angeles.

References

External links

 
 Needles Chamber of Commerce

 
Cities in San Bernardino County, California
Cities in the Mojave Desert
Communities in the Lower Colorado River Valley
Incorporated cities and towns in California
Lower Colorado River Valley
Mojave Desert
California populated places on the Colorado River